Todd Mooney (born June 13, 1965) is a former American football and baseball coach. He was the first head football coach at LaGrange College in LaGrange, Georgia, serving from 2006 until midway through the 2013 season. In 2008, Mooney led LaGrange to a 9–2 record and a Saint Louis Intercollegiate Athletic Conference championship. This turnaround followed consecutive 0–10 seasons to begin the program. This single-season turnaround was the best in NCAA Division III football history.

Head coaching record

Football

Notes

References

1965 births
Living people
LaGrange Panthers football coaches
Oberlin Yeomen baseball coaches
Oberlin Yeomen football coaches
Ohio Bobcats football coaches
Rhodes Lynx football coaches
Urbana Blue Knights football coaches
People from Westerville, Ohio